The Hellenic Merchant Navy refers to the merchant navy of Greece, engaged in commerce and transportation of goods and services universally. It consists of the merchant vessels owned by Greek civilians, flying either the Greek flag or a flag of convenience. As of 2020, Greece is the largest ship owner country in the world in terms of tonnage; with a total deadweight tonnage of 364 million tons and 4,901 Greek-owned vessels. Greece is a maritime nation by tradition, as shipping is arguably the oldest form of occupation of the Greeks and a key element of Greek economic activity since the ancient times. Today it is the second largest contributor to the national economy after tourism. The Greek fleet flies a variety of flags; however, some Greek shipowners gradually return to Greece following the changes to the legislative framework governing their operations and the improvement of infrastructure.

History

Greece is a maritime nation by tradition, as shipping is arguably the oldest form of occupation of the Greeks and has been a key element of Hellenic economic activity since ancient times. The Greeks continued to be involved and play a major role in shipping during the Byzantine period as well as during the Ottoman period, and Greek ships could be found especially in the ports of the eastern Mediterranean.

In 1860s and after the War of Independence, the financial crisis saw some of these businesses collapse Nonetheless, the tradition of endowment continued, and it was shipping that funded institutions such as the National Library of Greece.

During the Second World War the Greek shipping companies were seen operating in the Allied areas and placing their fleets under control of the British Merchant Marine.

After the end of World War II the Greek-run fleets were able to re-establish themselves under their national flag. The changing dynamics saw them more closely aligned to their own national state, and the establishment of the Greek Merchant Marine service.

Development in Asia
Greek firms have managed to capture the expansion of Asia, particularly China. It is mostly the dry bulk shipping firms that have benefited from the development, since iron ore and coal are the two major resources that are required for a country's infrastructure to be taken to the next level. Since 2000, China has provided lucrative contracts both on the spot, and time charter market for dry bulk shipowners. As a result, many new shipping tycoons were created.

Shipowners
Traditionally Greek shipping has been run as a family business, with family members located in key ports or in key positions, and in the past with marriages cementing relationships between commercial dynasties. These close-knit families have allowed financially sensitive information to be kept within the local community, with many transactions kept within trusted family networks. Some historic shipping families include:

From the 18th century:
Kountouriotis from Hydra (island)
Miaoulis (Vokos) from Hydra (island)

19th century:
Embirikos from Andros
Goulandris from Andros
Kourtzis from Lesbos
Lemos from Oinousses
Lyras family from Oinousses
Mavroleon family from Kasos
Rethymnis family from Kasos
Hadjilias family from Kasos
Kulukundis family from Kasos
Hadjipateras from Oinousses
Pateras from Oinousses Chios 
Fafalios from Chios
Pittas family from Chios
Ralli Brothers from Chios
Michalinos from Chios
Rodocanachi from Chios
Panayis Athanase Vagliano, from Cephalonia, considered the "father of modern Greek shipping"

The twentieth century saw more Greek shipping magnates established, including:

Alafouzos from Santorini
Angelopoulos from Arcadia, Peloponnese
Chandris from Chios
Carras from Chios
Eugenidis from Thrace
Frangou from Chios
Kulukundis and Mavroleon from Kasos
Latsis from Katakolo, Peloponnese
Livanos from Chios 
Marinakis from Crete 
Niarchos from Sparti
Peratikos from Syros & Chios
Polemis from Andros
Houlis from Piraeus
Onassis from Smyrna
Soutos from Samos
Vardinogiannis from Crete
Vernicos from Sifnos

Contemporary (21st century) shipowners include also: 
John Angelicoussis
Vassilis C. Constantakopoulos from Messinia
George Economou (shipbuilder)
Minos Kyriakou from Poros
Dimitris Melissanidis from Pontus
Pericles Panagopoulos 
Leon Patitsas
George Prokopiou
Nikolas Tsakos from Chios

Greek shipping companies
Some notable Greek shipping companies include:

 Aegean Oil
 Aegean Speed Lines (ferries)
 Andriaki Shipping
 Alpha Lines
 ANEK Lines (ferries)
 Atlas Maritime
 Attica Group (ferries)
 Arcadia Shipmanagement Co. Ltd
 Avin International
 Blue star (ferries)
 Capital Product Partners L.P.
 Costamare
 Ceres LNG Services
 Danaos Corporation
 Delta Tankers
 DryShips Inc
 Excel Maritime Carriers Ltd
 European Seaways
 Euroseas Ltd.
 Hellenic Seaways
 Kefalonian Lines
 Levante ferries
 Euroseas Ltd.
 Maran Tankers
 Majestic International Cruises
 Navios Maritime Holdings
 Nereus Shipping S.A. / CM Lemos
 Ocean Rig
 Overseas Shipholding Group- Stelmar Ltd
 Polembros Maritime
 Superfast Ferries (ferries)
 Tsakos Energy Navigation
 Variety Cruises

Ranks and rank insignia 
Deck Officers

Engineer officers

Engineer officers use exactly the same rank insignia as deck officers. The only difference is that "in between" the golden stripes, the color is not black but dark purple. In some cases, dark red has been used; however, dark red refers usually to electrician officers. Engineer officers come from the same Merchant Marine academies as bridge officers. After graduation from the Marine Academy, bridge officers undergoing a series of rigorous training in order to specialize for specific types of ships that they are about to serve on board (LNGC, LPG, VLCC, Dry Cargo, Suezmaxes, Ro/Pax, ULCC etc.) and to meet the stringent requirements of various international conventions (SOLAS, STCW, MARPOL etc.) and companies' managing systems. Some of the training options include (but are not limited to) the following: advanced oil/gas/chemical tanker training, ECDIS, ISM, ISPS, heavy weather navigation, cargo control systems and procedures, navigation deck simulators, electronic navigation systems, integrated navigation systems (INS), radio communications, dynamic positioning systems (DP), passage planning and procedures etc. All of the above training takes place in private marine education centers approved by the Hellenic Government and internationally by the IMO.
All other officers found on board Hellenic Merchant Marine Vessels come from universities and other higher education institutes.

Rank exceptions
There are two more ranks that can be found on Hellenic Merchant Marine vessels, namely staff captain and staff chief engineer. Both these ranks can be found only on passenger and cruiser-pleasure yachts. These officers assist the captain and the chief engineer in turn while both have acquired the diploma of captain and chief engineer. However, they have a smaller service record and wait for their turn for the top of the line rank. Note that the highest ranks that can be obtained in the Hellenic Merchant Marine are the captain and the chief engineer, and both officers come from the Merchant Marine Academy. No other type of officer can reach these ranks.
Other officers
Other officers that serve on board Hellenic Merchant Marine vessels are economic officers, electricians, doctors and radio officers.

Promotions
Hellenic Merchant Marine officers get their promotions after a 2-year service period from 2nd officer rank to chief officer rank and after 6 months of studies and exams at the KESEN center. KESEN stands for Center of Further Education and Training of Masters and Officers. To become captain requires a 3-year sea service period and 6 months of studies and exams at the KESEN center. All other officers are promoted after evaluations from the ship owning company.

See also
 List of ports in Greece 
 Aristotle Onassis
 List of Greek companies
 Economy of Greece
 Greek Steamship Company (also Hellenic Steam Navigation Co. and New Greek Steamship Co.)
 Greeks of the Sea, a TV documentary screened on SBS ONE in Australia from 19 July to 2 August 2014

References

External links
Greek Ministry of Mercantile Marine
Shipping directory
Greek Shipping Publications
History of Greek shipping
Posidonia-Bi-annual International Shipping Exhibition 
House flags of Greek shipping companies
  George Bitros and Ioanna Minoglou: Entrepreneurship and market order: Some historical evidence  Munich University Personal RePEc Archive
Review of maritime transport 2007
The marine sector in Greece
Hellenic Shipping Business Networking

 
Merchant navies by country
Shipping